William Joseph Corbet (12 December 1824 – 1 December 1909) was an Irish nationalist politician and Member of Parliament (MP) for constituencies in County Wicklow for most of the period from 1880 to 1900. He was also a mental health administrator, author and noted dog breeder.

Early life 

Third son of Robert Corbet of Ballykaneen, Queen's County (now County Offaly), by Alice, youngest daughter of John Mulhall of Clonaslee, County Offaly, he was educated at Broadwood Academy, Lancashire. He worked for 30 years in the Irish Lunacy Office, as a Clerk in 1847–53 and Chief Clerk, 1853–77. He was elected a member of the Royal Irish Academy (MRIA) in 1874.

Political career 

In the 1880 general election he was elected as one of two Home Rule League members for Wicklow, taking his seat in the House of Commons of the United Kingdom of Great Britain and Ireland.  The Wicklow constituency was divided under the Redistribution of Seats Act 1885, and at the following 1885 general election he was elected by a much larger majority for the new Eastern division of Wicklow constituency, and again in 1886. In the enlarged Irish Parliamentary Party, he was much older than most of his fellow MPs, who were typically born around the time of the Irish Famine in the later 1840s.

When the Irish Parliamentary Party split in December 1890 over Parnell's leadership, Corbet was one of the minority who supported Parnell. At the subsequent general election in 1892, he lost his seat to John Sweetman, an Anti-Parnellite, standing for the Irish National Federation, coming third after the Unionist candidate. However, at the general election in July 1895, at the age of 70, he fought back and won the Wicklow East seat by the narrow majority of 87 votes over the Unionist, the Anti-Parnellite this time coming third. This was in spite of the fact that Sweetman, having changed allegiance, had resigned the seat on 8 April 1895 and lost the subsequent by-election 26 April 1895 when he stood as a Parnellite candidate.

Corbet retired from Parliament at the general election of 1900.

Personal life 
Corbet was an enthusiastic sportsman from boyhood and owner of a famous breed of Irish red setters. He used to go shooting with Parnell, who was a fellow Wicklow resident. Parnell's brother John Howard Parnell described Corbet as Charles's 'great sporting chum'. John Parnell also quoted a verse "In Memory of the Chief", which Corbet wrote for the card issued on the first anniversary of Charles Parnell's death, 6 October 1892.

He married first, Elizabeth, daughter of Richard Jennings (she died in 1870), and, secondly, to Marie, daughter of David Fitzhenry.

Memorial

The Freeman's Journal of 11 September 1911 describes the erection of a memorial tablet to Corbet in St Patrick's Roman Catholic Church, Kilquade Hill, Kilquade, Greystones, County Wicklow, and also gives an account of his life, political and literary.

References

Writings
 Songs of My Summer Time (published under the pseudonym 'Harry Wildair'), Dublin, 1864
The Battle of Fontenoy:  A Historical Poem, Dublin, McGlashan & Gill, 1871 (revised ed. 1885)
Ode for the Centenary of Thomas Moore, 1879
‘On the statistics of insanity, past and present’, Journal of the Statistical and Social Inquiry Society of Ireland, Vol.VI, Part XLVI, 1873/74, pp. 382–94
'Is Ireland a Nation?', The Irish Question No.19, London, Irish Press Agency, 1887
'On the Increase of Insanity', American Journal of Insanity, 50: 224–38, 1893
'The Increase of Insanity', Fortnightly Review, January 1893, pp. 7–19
What is Home Rule?
Parnellism or Healyism – Which?

Note:  The last two publications are listed in Who Was Who but no details are given and they do not appear to be available in British or Irish libraries.

Sources
Freeman's Journal, 3 December 1909
John Howard Parnell, Charles Stewart Parnell:  A Memoir, London, Constable, 1916
Michael Stenton & Stephen Lees, Who's Who of British members of parliament, Vol.2 1886–1918, Sussex, Harvester Press, 1978
Brian M. Walker (ed.), Parliamentary Election Results in Ireland, 1801–1922, Dublin, Royal Irish Academy, 1978
Who Was Who, 1897–1916

External links
‘On the statistics of insanity, past and present’
German-language article on development of the Irish setter, including the role of W. J. Corbet
 

1824 births
1909 deaths
People from County Wicklow
Members of the Parliament of the United Kingdom for County Wicklow constituencies (1801–1922)
UK MPs 1880–1885
UK MPs 1885–1886
UK MPs 1886–1892
UK MPs 1895–1900
Irish Parliamentary Party MPs
Members of the Royal Irish Academy
Parnellite MPs
Irish non-fiction writers
Irish male non-fiction writers
Politicians from County Offaly
Dog breeders